It's a Miracle can refer to:
 "It's a Miracle" (Barry Manilow song), 1975 song
 "It's a Miracle" (Culture Club song), 1983 song
 "It's a Miracle" (Crashdïet song), 2005 song
 "It's a Miracle", a song by Roger Waters from the album Amused to Death
 It's a Miracle (TV series), a PAX TV show